|}

The Charlie Hall Chase is a Grade 2 National Hunt steeplechase in England which is open to horses aged five years or older. It is run at Wetherby over a distance of about 3 miles (3 miles and 45 yards, or 4,869 metres), with 19 fences. The race is scheduled to take place each year in late October or early November.

The event was established in 1969, and it was originally called the Wetherby Pattern Chase. It replaced the Emblem Handicap Chase, a handicap named after Emblem, the winner of the Grand National in 1863.

The race became known as the Charlie Hall Memorial Wetherby Pattern Chase in 1978, in memory of the trainer Charlie Hall. This was shortened to the present title in 1990.

The Charlie Hall Chase has been sponsored by Bet365 since 2003.

Records
Most successful horse (2 wins):
 Wayward Lad – 1983, 1985
 Celtic Shot – 1990, 1991
 Barton Bank – 1993, 1995
 One Man – 1996, 1997
 See More Business – 1999, 2000
 Ollie Magern – 2005, 2007

Leading jockey (3 wins):
 Graham Bradley – Righthand Man (1982), Wayward Lad (1985), Celtic Shot (1991)
 Carl Llewellyn – Tipping Tim (1992), Young Hustler (1994), Ollie Magern (2005)
 Mick Fitzgerald – See More Business (1999, 2000), Marlborough (2002)

Leading trainer (6 wins):
 Nigel Twiston-Davies – Tipping Tim (1992), Young Hustler (1994), Ollie Magern (2005, 2007), Bristol de Mai (2017), Ballyoptic (2019)

Winners since 1981

Earlier winners

 1969 – Arcturus
 1970 – Kildrummy
 1971 – no race
 1972 – Coxswain
 1973 – Dunrobin
 1974 – Tamalin
 1975 – Davy Lad
 1976 – Current Gold / Set Point
 1977 – Goolagong
 1978 – Fighting Fit
 1979 – Sparkie's Choice
 1980 – Manton Castle

See also
 Horse racing in Great Britain
 List of British National Hunt races
 Recurring events established in 1969  – this race is included under its original title, Wetherby Pattern Chase.

References
 Racing Post:
 pedigreequery.com – Charlie Hall Chase – Wetherby.
 runnersandriders.co.uk – Runners and Riders – British National Hunt and Flat Racing.

External links

 Race Recordings 

National Hunt races in Great Britain
Wetherby Racecourse
National Hunt chases
1969 establishments in England
Recurring sporting events established in 1969